New Philadelphia is a city in and the county seat of Tuscarawas County, Ohio, United States. The county's largest city, New Philadelphia lies along the Tuscarawas River. The population was 17,677 at the 2020 census.

In 1772, the Moravian Christians founded the community of Schoenbrunn in the area, which was the first settlement of the Northwest Territory. The Christian pacifist settlement was subsequently abandoned during the American Revolution. After the area was resettled in 1804, because of the presence of coal and clay, early industry in the city centered on mining interests and the manufacture of steel, canned goods, roofing tile, sewer pipe, bricks, vacuum cleaners, stovepipes, carriages, flour, brooms, and pressed, stamped, and enameled goods.

History 

The Moravian Church, under the leadership of David Zeisberger, founded Schoenbrunn ("beautiful spring"), also known as Welhik Tuppeek ("the best spring"), in 1772 as a mission to the Delaware Indians. The settlement grew to include sixty dwellings and more than 300 inhabitants, both Munsee and Germans, who drew up Ohio's first civil code and built its first Christian church and schoolhouse. Problems associated with the American Revolution prompted Schoenbrunn's closing in 1777.

John Knisely, who was from Pennsylvania, wanted to settle in a location where game was more plentiful and was welcomed by the Christian Indians of Goshen; he returned to Ohio in 1804 with his family and 33 other pioneers, hiring surveyor John Wells to plot out the modern city of New Philadelphia in the same grid style as Philadelphia, Pennsylvania.

In 1833, New Philadelphia contained county buildings, a printing office, several stores, and five taverns.

Geography
New Philadelphia is located at  (40.489411, -81.447324), along the Tuscarawas River. It lies within the ecoregion of the Western Allegheny Plateau.

Layout
New Philadelphia's design was based on the design of Philadelphia, Pennsylvania. The two main streets in the city are High Avenue and Broadway, both of which were named after two main streets from Philadelphia, except, in Philadelphia, High Avenue was renamed Market Street in 1858, "the High Street" was the familiar name of the principal street in nearly every English town at the time Philadelphia was founded, and Broad Street is the closest street name in Philadelphia to Broadway. No historical records exist for a road named Broadway in Philadelphia.

Climate
New Philadelphia has a humid continental climate, abbreviated "Dfa" on climate maps.

Demographics

2020 census
As of the census of 2020, there were 17,677 people, 7,282 households, and 4,541 families living in the city. The racial makeup of the city was 94.0% White, 1.2% African American, 0.4% Native American, 0.6% Asian, 0.4% Pacific Islander, 1.6% from other races, and 1.8% from two or more races. Hispanic or Latino of any race were 4.2% of the population.

There were 7,282 households, of which 27.8% had children under the age of 18 living with them, 45.3% were married couples living together, 12.3% had a female householder with no husband present, 4.7% had a male householder with no wife present, and 37.6% were non-families. 31.4% of all households were made up of individuals, and 12.6% had someone living alone who was 65 years of age or older. The average household size was 2.32 and the average family size was 2.87.

The median age in the city was 40.4 years. 21.9% of residents were under the age of 18; 8.7% were between the ages of 18 and 24; 24.9% were from 25 to 44; 27.6% were from 45 to 64; and 16.8% were 65 years of age or older. The gender makeup of the city was 48.5% male and 51.5% female.

2000 census
As of the census of 2000, there were 17,056 people, 7,338 households, and 4,659 families living in the city. The population density was 2,188.0 people per square mile (844.3/km2). There were 7,796 housing units at an average density of 1,000.1 per square mile (385.9/km2). The racial makeup of the city was 96.89% White, 0.97% African American, 0.18% Native American, 0.49% Asian, 0.06% Pacific Islander, 0.49% from other races, and 0.93% from two or more races. Hispanic or Latino of any race were 1.33% of the population.

There were 7,338 households, out of which 28.0% had children under the age of 18 living with them, 48.9% were married couples living together, 11.3% had a female householder with no husband present, and 36.5% were non-families. 31.7% of all households were made up of individuals, and 13.2% had someone living alone who was 65 years of age or older. The average household size was 2.30 and the average family size was 2.88.

In the city the population was spread out, with 23.0% under the age of 18, 9.4% from 18 to 24, 28.2% from 25 to 44, 23.7% from 45 to 64, and 15.8% who were 65 years of age or older. The median age was 38 years. For every 100 females, there were 90.7 males. For every 100 females age 18 and over, there were 87.1 males.

The median income for a household in the city was $33,235, and the median income for a family was $42,896. Males had a median income of $32,157 versus $20,363 for females. The per capita income for the city was $18,745. About 7.7% of families and 10.2% of the population were below the poverty line, including 12.7% of those under age 18 and 6.2% of those age 65 or over.

Tuscora Park

Tuscora Park is a municipal park that features a carousel, ferris wheel, miniature railroad, roller coaster, swing ride, and kiddie rides, along with miniature golf, playgrounds, a swimming pool, and batting cages.  Tuscora Park was originally built as a project of the Works Progress Administration; original stone work gates, paths and retaining walls still adorn the park.  The park is now the home of the Park Place Teen Center, a facility for high school students that provides entertainment of all types. Events at the park include a Summer Showcase and the annual First Town Days festival.

The Summer Showcase is held in the Tuscora Park Amphitheater. Events at the amphitheater include Sunday church services, plays and concerts featuring local talent. On the last day of the First Town Days festival the park hosts the U.S. Air Force Band of Flight, which plays in the amphitheater.

Around 1940, New Philadelphia purchased the Herschell-Spillman carousel secondhand. It is a rare all-wooden carousel.  It includes 36 carved wooden jumping horses, two chariots and 428 individual lights. The center panels are adorned with 14 original oil paintings. Music is provided by a Wurlitzer #153 military Band Organ. The carousel is 40 feet in diameter and weighs 10 tons.  It was manufactured in 1928 by the Spillman Manufacturing Company of North Tonawanda, New York. David Miller is well known for his 40 years of service on the Tuscora Park Carousel.
The First Town Days, which includes a Grand Parade and fireworks display, runs on the weekend leading up to the Fourth of July.

The company that manages Tuscora Park is a non-profit, RTY Inc. The organization frequently hires high school and college students to operate rides and sell tickets.

Education

Primary and secondary
Children in New Philadelphia are served by the New Philadelphia City School District. The current schools in the district are:
 Central Elementary School – 145 Ray Avenue NW, grade 5
 East Elementary School – 470 Fair Avenue NE, grades K-1
 South Elementary School – 132 Providence Avenue SW, grades 2-3
 West Elementary School – 232 Tuscarawas Avenue NW, grade 4
 York Elementary School – 938 Stonecreek Road SW, grades K-1
 Welty Middle School – 315 Fourth Street NW, grades 6-8
 New Philadelphia High School – 343 Ray Avenue NW, grades 9-12

Postsecondary
Kent State University at Tuscarawas, a regional campus of Kent State University, is located in the city. The campus offers 11 bachelor's and 15 associate degree programs, and students can begin any of the nearly 300 degree programs offered by Kent State. Kent State Tuscarawas is unique in that it is locally owned, the only locally owned regional campus in Ohio.

The Tuscarawas Performing Arts Center (PAC) is also located on the KSU/T Campus.

Library

The Tuscarawas County Public Library is the main branch of six in its library system, located in New Philadelphia, the county seat. The other five of its six branches consist of the Bolivar Branch, Strasburg Branch, Sugarcreek Branch, Tuscarawas (Tusky) Branch, and the Mobile Services Branch that is also located in New Philadelphia. 

The Main Library is located at 121 Fair Avenue just off of North Broadway Street. The TCPL System is a member of the SEO(Serving Every Ohioan) Library Consortium, a system consisting of 98 public libraries.

The SEO Service Center, located in Caldwell, is a branch of the State Library of Ohio, which supports a consortium of 98 Library systems at 268 service points throughout 49 counties across Ohio using the OPLIN network.

SEO supports a centralized shared catalog database that includes over 8.1 million items with a patron database of nearly one million users, with an annual circulation of over 15 million.

Retail
The city's main retail center is in and around New Towne Mall, which opened in 1988.

Transportation
Interstate 77 passes west of New Philadelphia's city center. U.S. Route 250 passes through the west and south sides of New Philadelphia. Ohio State Route 39 and Ohio State Route 800 also run through the city.

The Akron-Canton Airport is the nearest commercial airport with scheduled passenger flights.

Harry Clever Field (FAA designation PHD) is a city owned airport 2 miles SE of the city center, adjacent to the Kent State Univetsity Tuscarawas Campus and Schoenbrunn Village.  It is open to small aircraft and has maintenance and fueling services on site, as well as a airport courtesy car.

Into the early 1950s the Baltimore and Ohio Railroad ran a six day a week passenger train from Wheeling, West Virginia through New Philadelphia en route to Akron and Cleveland.

Notable people
 Elizabeth Dejeans, novelist
 A. Victor Donahey, Ohio governor, United States senator
 William Donahey, illustrator, The Teenie Weenies
 Norman Bel Geddes, industrial designer
 Cie Grant, former National Football League player for the New Orleans Saints
 Woody Hayes, Football coach for Ohio State University
 William Helmick, Republican congressman
 Esther Nelson Karn, poet
 Dave Leggett, football player for the Ohio State Buckeyes and the Chicago Cardinals
 John Mackey, American composer
 Bill Moffit, American composer
 William H. Nicklas, church architect 
 Hugh Talbot Patrick. pioneering American neurologist
 Lenny Simonetti, professional football player
 Victor Sterki, physician, malacologist, naturalist, research associate Carnegie Museum Natural History (Pittsburgh)
 J. Foster Wilkin, Ohio Supreme Court justice
 Robert Nugen Wilkin, federal judge and Ohio Supreme Court justice

References

External links

County seats in Ohio
Settlements of the Moravian Church
History of the America (North) Province of the Moravian Church
Populated places established in 1804
Cities in Tuscarawas County, Ohio
1804 establishments in Ohio
Cities in Ohio